The Unified Vehicular Volume Reduction Program (UVVRP), commonly called number coding or color coding, is a road space rationing program in the Philippines that aims to reduce traffic congestion, in particular during peak hours, by restricting the types of vehicles that can use major public roads based on the final digit of the vehicle's license plate. First implemented in 1995 in Metro Manila, the similar programs has also been implemented in the cities of Baguio, Cabanatuan, and Dagupan and the province of Cavite.

History
The Unified Vehicular Volume Reduction Program was the culmination of two plans devised in the mid-1990s to help resolve the issue of heavy traffic congestion in Metro Manila, which by then was the subject of much complaint among motorists, by restricting the number of vehicles on the road. Although it was first implemented in 1995, the UVVRP in its current form dates back to 1996.

The traffic situation in Metro Manila and initial impetus (1995)
The original UVVRP was conceived by Col. Romeo Maganto, who served as the executive director of the Metropolitan Manila Development Authority's traffic management office. First implemented in October 1995 on an experimental basis, to address the traffic congestion caused by the construction of the Metro Rail Transit Line 3 (MRT-3) on Epifanio de los Santos Avenue (EDSA), it initially targeted public utility vehicles, later expanding to all vehicles plying EDSA, where traffic congestion in Metro Manila was at its heaviest. Vehicles covered under the original UVVRP were banned from EDSA for the entire day based on the last digit of a vehicle's license plate, similar to the current UVVRP.

On November 6, 1995, upon the urging of public transport groups, Maganto expanded the UVVRP to include all vehicles on most Metro Manila roads in an attempt to prevent rat running, which caused private vehicular traffic to use secondary roads alongside jeepneys. By this time, of the estimated 1.1 million motor vehicles then plying city roads, around 70 percent of those vehicles — which numbered around 800,000 — were private vehicles, and the MMDA was under pressure to resolve Metro Manila's worsening traffic problems. The worsening traffic on secondary roads forced Maganto to implement a blanket ban on private vehicles as well, with the ban being implemented during rush hour from 7:00 to 9:00 a.m. and 5:00–7:00 p.m.

The UVVRP, however, at this time was still largely voluntary, and while it was implemented by Maganto's office, the program did not have a legal basis in Metro Manila law. Mayors, in particular Jejomar Binay of Makati, were leery of the program, accusing Maganto of circumventing the Metro Manila Council, which sets policy for the MMDA, and with Maganto even threatening to resign if mayors did not support the plan. This was compounded by the fact that Maganto's original scheme did not specify penalties for violations of the UVVRP, since penalties could only be imposed by the MMC. Tensions came to a head on November 21, 1995, when Senator Vicente Sotto III had to appeal to Maganto and the mayors during a Senate hearing on the scheme to work together to resolve Metro Manila's traffic problems.

This changed when on November 23, 1995, Chairman Prospero Oreta signed MMDA Regulation No. 95-001, which codified Maganto's scheme, and mandated that strict implementation of the program begin on December 1, 1995. The final version adopted by the MMDA combined elements of the original UVVRP and the partial ban implemented by Maganto for private vehicles, where vehicles with plate numbers ending in an odd number were to be barred from major streets in Metro Manila on Mondays, Wednesdays, and Fridays, and vehicles with plate numbers ending in an even number were to barred on Tuesdays, Thursdays, and Saturdays, from 7:00 to 9:00 a.m. and 5:00 to 7:00 p.m. No total ban was mandated in the version passed by the MMC. This was the subject of much confusion and criticism on the first day of implementation, with motorists claiming that the new scheme did not significantly reduce traffic congestion, unlike Maganto's original scheme.

Return to the original UVVRP (1996–2003)
Although the UVVRP was implemented in the manner specified in MMDA Regulation 95-001, the original UVVRP was reimplemented in early 1996, with Maganto announcing a twelve-hour ban on vehicles plying EDSA depending on the final digit of the vehicle's license plate. Originally imposed due to rehabilitation works on the Guadalupe Bridge, the start of three major road projects resulted in the ban being extended to September in order to reduce the number of vehicles using EDSA to go around affected roads in inner Manila, coexisting alongside the odd-even UVVRP which was implemented on all other roads.

COVID-19 pandemic
The program was suspended in Metro Manila from March 13, 2020 to November 30, 2021 during the community quarantines due to the COVID-19 pandemic, except in Makati, where a modified number coding scheme was being implemented, except on vehicles carrying two or more passengers and during weekends and holidays.

The suspension was lifted on December 1, 2021, this time implementing a modified scheme. All vehicles with banned motor vehicle plate endings under the UVVRP, except for public utility vehicles, transportation network vehicle services, motorcycles, garbage trucks, fuel trucks, and vehicles carrying essential and perishable goods and physicians with valid ID are covered in the modified scheme from 5:00 to 8:00 p.m. on Mondays to Fridays, excluding holidays. Meanwhile, light trucks are prohibited from using EDSA between Magallanes, Makati and North Avenue, Quezon City from 5:00 a.m. to 8:00 p.m. from Mondays to Fridays, excluding holidays. The scheme was later expanded to morning rush hours on August 15, 2022, from 7:00 to 10:00 a.m. from Mondays to Fridays, excluding holidays.

The full number coding scheme in Makati was resumed on March 16, 2022, wherein all vehicles with banned motor vehicle plate endings under the UVVRP, except for "vehicles carrying Senior Citizen Blu Card holders as drivers or passengers and those under official functions and medical emergencies," are covered in the scheme from 7:00 a.m. to 7:00 p.m. from Mondays to Fridays, excluding holidays.

Current implementation

The following table shows which plate number endings are barred from traveling in Metro Manila:

As of November 2, 2016, UVVRP is currently implemented as follows:

 Applies from 7:00am to 8:00pm.
 No window hours. Some differences apply for certain cities. See below.
 Applies to roads in Metro Manila.
 EDSA, C-5 Road, and Roxas Boulevard have no window hours regardless of which city the driver is in.
 Public Utility Buses (City and Provincial) do not have window hours.
 Motorcycles are completely exempted.

The following are city-specific implementations:

 Makati: No window hours
 Las Piñas: No window hours
 Mandaluyong: No window hours
 Pasig: No window hours
 Marikina: UVVRP not implemented
 Taguig: UVVRP not implemented, however it is enforced on the National Roads within its boundaries, i.e. C5, East Service Road and Manuel L. Quezon.
 Muntinlupa: UVVRP not implemented
 Malabon: UVVRP not implemented, except in C-4 Road and MacArthur Highway
 Parañaque: window hours from 9:00 a.m. to 4:00 p.m.
 No window hours, and only on the roads below
 Barangay Don Bosco: San Antonio Avenue, Pres. Aguinaldo Street, Dominique Savio Street, Japan Street, Michael Rua Street, and France Street
 Barangay Don Bosco: Doña Soledad Extension, Doña Soledad Avenue
 Barangay Moonwalk: E. Rodriguez Street
 East Service Road from Dr. Santos Avenue up to FTI Parañaque area
 West Service Road from Dr. Santos Avenue up to Merville Park Subdivision, Parañaque area
 Pasay – Not implemented in the following roads:
 Ninoy Aquino Avenue
 NAIA Road
 Domestic Road
 Airport Road
 Sales Road
 Portions of Buendia

See also 
 No Contact Apprehension Policy
 Road space rationing
 Odd-even rationing
 Low-emission zone
 Congestion pricing

References

Transportation in Metro Manila
Rationing by country
Regulation in the Philippines